The Battle of the Strong is an 1898 novel by Gilbert Parker. It was first published in serial format in The Atlantic Monthly starting in January 1898, and as a single volume late in the same year. It was ranked as the tenth-highest best selling book overall in the United States for 1898, and appeared as high as Number 2 on the monthly bestseller list published in The Bookman in early 1899.  The book is set in the Channel Islands, primarily during the period 1781-95, and opens with attempted invasion of Jersey by France in the Battle of Jersey.

The title is derived from Ecclesiastes 9:11, "the race is not to the swift, nor the battle to the strong."

Willis Steell and Edward Everett Rose adapted the novel into a play in 1900, which starred Maurice Barrymore and Marie Burroughs.  Of the play, Parker later remarked that "the adaption, however, was lacking much, and though Miss Marie Burroughs and Maurice Barrymore played in it, success did not attend its dramatic life."

References

External links
 The Battle of the Strong full text at Project Gutenberg
 The Battle of the Strong scan of 1898 novel at Google Books

Novels set in the Channel Islands
Jersey in fiction
Works originally published in The Atlantic (magazine)
1898 Canadian novels